Princess Ida Matilda Adelaide of Schaumburg-Lippe (Bückeburg, 28 July 1852 – Schleiz, 28 September 1891) was the consort of Heinrich XXII, Prince Reuss of Greiz from 1872 until her death. She was the mother of Hermine Reuss of Greiz, second wife of Wilhelm II, the last German Emperor.

Family and early life
She was a daughter of Adolf I, Prince of Schaumburg-Lippe and his wife Princess Hermine of Waldeck and Pyrmont. Her siblings included Georg, Prince of Schaumburg-Lippe and Prince Adolf of Schaumburg-Lippe, husband of Princess Viktoria of Prussia.

Despite their high birth, Ida and her siblings were brought up very simply; one report said they "knew more about the kitchen than many women of lower degree". Ida was also well educated, and was able to hold her own in discussions about philosophy and science with the learned men in her principality.

Marriage and issue
On 8 October 1872, Ida married Heinrich XXII, the reigning sovereign Prince of Reuss since he came of age in 1867.

They had the following children:

 Henry XXIV, Prince Reuss of Greiz (1878–1927)
 Princess Emma (1881–1961) ∞ (1903) Count Erich Künigl von Ehrenburg (1880–1930)
 Princess Marie (1882–1942) ∞ (1904) Baron Ferdinand von Gnagnoni (1878–1955)
 Princess Caroline (1884–1905) ∞ (1903) Wilhelm Ernst, Grand Duke of Saxe-Weimar-Eisenach (1876–1923)
 Princess Hermine (1887–1947) ∞ I. (1907) Prince Johann Georg of Schoenaich-Carolath (1873–1920); ∞ II. (1922) Ex-Kaiser Wilhelm II (1859–1941)
 Princess Ida (1891–1977) ∞ (1911) Fürst Christoph Martin III. zu Stolberg-Roßla (1888–1949)

Death
Ida died on 28 September 1891, at the age of 39 at Schleiz.

Ancestry

References

Sources

1852 births
1891 deaths
House of Lippe
Princesses of Schaumburg-Lippe
House of Reuss
Princesses of Reuss
Daughters of monarchs